"The Jukebox Played Along" is a song recorded by American country music artist Gene Watson.  It was released in July 1989 as the third single from the album Back in the Fire.  The song reached #24 on the Billboard Hot Country Singles & Tracks chart.  The song was written by Ken Bell and Charles Quillen.

Chart performance

References

1989 singles
1988 songs
Gene Watson songs
Songs written by Ken Bell (songwriter)
Songs written by Charles Quillen
Song recordings produced by Paul Worley
Warner Records singles